Live Foyn Friis  
is a Norwegian singer, lyricist and composer, with roots in jazz, pop and improvised music.

Biography 
Friis was educated at the Conservatory of Music in Tromsø, Kungliga Musikhögskolan in Stockholm and Det Jyske Musikkonservatorium in Århus with a Master's degree in Rhythmic Vocals 2011. From the time in Tromsø, she performed concerts with several local musicians, including the groups AMOK, Live Friis & Co og Groove Design. During Bobby McFerrins tour in Norway in 2009 she was contacted by Rikskonsertene to sing a duet with him in the grand hall of the Culture House in Tromsø.

Friis is a singer and songwriter in the band Foyn Trio! The other band members are Alex Jønsson (guitar, effects and vocals) and Jens Mikkel Madsen (double bass, vocals). 
She also leads the band Live Foyn Friis, comprising drummer Andreas Skamby, as well as the members of Foyn Trio!, besides the orchestra Live Foyn Friis with Strings, comprising the band members of Live Foyn Friis, as well Louise Grom (violin), Amalie Kjældgaard (violin), Mikkel Schreiber (viola) and Maria Edlund (cello).

She performed with Danmarks Radio's Big Band in Concert Hall, Study 2 in Copenhagen 2012 and was awarded Årets unge jazzkomponist (This year's young jazz composer) and Danmarks Nye Jazz Stjerne (Denmark's New Jazz Star). Moreover, Foyn Trio album Joy Visible was nominated for Årets Danske Vokaljazz Utgivelse (This year's Danske Vokaljazz Release), all during the 2012 Danish Music Awards.

Since then, she has had a great international career, and regularly travels Brazil, the United States, and throughout Europe (Spain, Iceland, Norway, Sweden, Denmark, Finland, Germany, Czech Republic, Poland, Switzerland, Slovakia, Italy, England and France ) and in 2018 she travels to Japan, and in 2019 to Cuba.

The singer has released 4 albums: Joy visible, Running heart, With Strings and With Aarhus Jazz Orchestra.

In the summer of 2017 she was signed to Universal, and released the single Copenhagen under the artist Liive.

In 2018 her first album was released with a mix of standards and originals. The first more traditional jazz album, and it was already played on radio in the US and UK before the release date.

Discography 

 Live Foyn Friis

 Running Heart (2014)
 With Strings (2015)
 With Aarhus Jazz Orchestra (2017)
 Foyn (2019)
 Værfast (2021)
 Live Sings Sassy (2022)

 Foyn Trio!

 Joy Visible (2011)
 «Dementor» (2012) single
 «Ahaahee» (2013) single
 «Sailing» (2013) single

 Foyn/Hess/AC/Sommer

 "Fooling Myself" (2018) single
[https://open.spotify.com/album/6HbVZTIbX8Fx1XmJ7lEDBH?si=diZ7sq5rTo2o176e16hVqg * «Willow» (2018) album

 Liive (L!ive)

[https://www.youtube.com/watch?v=_wC9ZiAPXn0 

 «København» (2017) single]
 «Tinka» (2018) single 
 «Denne Julen» (2018) single
 «Gaslightning» (2019) single
 «Kaos» (2020) single
 «Enough» (2020) single
 «Divine» (2021) single
 «Høstkjærlighet» (2021) single
 «Umulig å gå» (2022) single

 The Baby Zebras 

 «Parents» (2020) album

 Liis
 «I’m Fine» (2016) single
 «Bizetstrasse» (2018) ep

 Rykte
 «Det går over» (2021) single

References

External links 
 

1985 births
Norwegian jazz singers
Norwegian composers
Musicians from Asker
Living people
21st-century Norwegian singers